Unione Sportiva Dilettantistica FiesoleCaldine is an Italian football club based in Fiesole, Tuscany. Currently it plays in Italy's Serie D.

History

Foundation
The club was founded in 1999 after the merger between G.S. Caldine (founded in 1922) and G.S. Fiesole (founded in 1958).

Serie D
In the season 2011–12 the team was promoted from Eccellenza Tuscany/B to Serie D.

Colors and badge
The team's colors are the blue light of G.S. Caldine and the green of G.S. Fiesole.

Honours
Eccellenza:
Winner (1): 2011–12

References

External links
Official website 

Association football clubs established in 1999
Football clubs in Tuscany
1999 establishments in Italy